Manepalli Narayanarao Venkatachaliah (born 25 October 1929) was the 25th Chief Justice of India. He served as Chief Justice from 1993 to 1994. He currently serves as the Chancellor of Sri Sathya Sai Institute of Higher Learning (Deemed University). and on the Advisory Board of Foundation for Restoration of National Values, a society established in 2008 that strives to restore National and Cultural Values of India.

He earned Bachelor of Science from University of Mysore and Bachelor Bachelor of Laws from the Bangalore university. He started practicing law in 1951. He was appointed Permanent Judge of the High Court of Karnataka on 6 November 1975. He was elevated as Judge of the Supreme Court of India on 5 October 1987. Finally, he became the 25th Chief Justice of India on 12 February 1993 and subsequently retired on 24 October 1994.

Post retirement, he has continued to work on anti-corruption and human rights issues, including support for the launch of the Initiatives of Change Centre for Governance in 2003.

He served as the Chairman of National Human Rights Commission from 1996-1998 and in 2000 he headed National Commission to review the working of the Constitution.

He is currently serving as the chancellor of the Sri Sathya Sai Institute of Higher Learning, Prasanthi Nilayam.

Honors

Padma Vibhushan - India's Second Highest Civilian Honour from the President of India in 2004.
 Doctor of Letters (honoris causa) - Pondicherry University
 Doctor of Laws (LL.D) (honoris causa) - Manipal University
 Honorary Doctorate from Rani Channamma University, Belagavi

References

Shri M.N. Venkatachaliah is a part of the selection jury in Mahaveer awards presented by Bhagwan Mahaveer Awards

External links
 Bio details, Supreme Court of India

1929 births
Living people
University Law College, Bangalore University alumni
Recipients of the Padma Vibhushan in public affairs
Chief justices of India
Karnataka politicians
University of Mysore alumni
Judges of the Karnataka High Court
20th-century Indian judges
20th-century Indian lawyers
Recipients of the Rajyotsava Award 2014
Telugu people
Madhva Brahmins